Southwest University (SWU) is a comprehensive university in Chongqing, China. It is a Chinese state Double First Class University Plan university.

Overview

Southwest University (SWU) is a comprehensive university sponsored by the Ministry of Education of China. It was founded in July 2005 with the merger of Southwest Normal University and Southwest Agricultural University, both of whose histories are over 100 years. It is one of the "Double First Class University Plan" and abolished "211 Project" universities which get preferential support for their development and construction from the Central Government of China. The total number of the students at SWU is more than 80,000, of which 50,000 are full-time students. There are also many international students working for their bachelor's, master's or doctor's degrees and other advanced studies in SWU every year.

SWU is located in Chongqing municipality, which is the central city in the Western China Development Project. Southwest University began to enroll international students in the 1950s. It is also one of the universities designated by the Ministry of Education to enroll Chinese Government Scholarship students. Most of the international students in SWU are now majoring in Chinese language, Pedagogy, Psychology, Economics, Business in China, Chinese Minorities Studies, Life Sciences, Food Sciences, Agriculture, Fine Arts, and Chinese Martial Arts etc. The qualified international students in Southwest University have the chance to get Chongqing Mayor Scholarships and SWU Excellent Overseas Students Scholarship. In addition, SWU is donating a share of Integrative Insurance for Medical Care and Accidents for every long-term overseas student.

The university covers a broad range of academic disciplines including philosophy, economics, law, pedagogics, literature, history, science, engineering, agriculture and management. It offers 40 national key disciplines, 66 doctoral programs, 9 postdoctoral programs, 159 master's programs and 97 bachelor's programs. SWU is known nationwide for its teaching methodological and agricultural studies. Studies in Pedagogics, psychology and agriculture have distinguished predominance in China; The Research of Silkworm genome is top in the world. A great deal of creative research works have been achieved in the fields like Zero Tillage Cultivation, Silkworm Genome, Studies on the Education and Psychological Behavior of Minorities in Southwestern China, and the Research on Human Time Cognition.

Colleges and departments
School of Marxism Studies
College of Political Science and Public Management
School of Law
College of Animal Science and Technology
College of Plant Protection
College of Agronomy and Biotechnology
College of Horticulture and Landscaping
College of Food Science
College of Textiles and Garment
College of Engineering and Technology
College of Computer and Information Science and College of Software
College of Resources and Environment
School of Material Science and Engineering
School of Geographical Science
College of Biotechnology
College of Life Sciences and Biological Technology
College of Chemistry and Chemical Engineering
College of Physics and Technology
College of Electronic Information Engineering
School of Mathematics and Statistics
College of Historic Cultures and College of Nationalities
School of Fine Arts
College of Music
College of International Studies
College of Chinese Language and Literature
College of Physical Education
Department of Psychology
Department of Education
College of State Governance
College of Economics and Management
School of Pharmaceutical Sciences
School of Journalism and Communication
College of Hanhong
College of Animal Science

History

Birth
Southwest University was originally established in 1906, during the Qing dynasty, as West China University. Much of its development occurred after the Republic of China was established.

Formal establishment
The modern university was established in July 2005, incorporating the former Southwest China Normal University and Southwest Agricultural University, with the approval of the Chinese Ministry of Education.

Campus buildings

The following buildings are on the campus:

 Art Gallery
 Basketball Building
 Soccer Court
 The Eighth Teaching Building
 The Thirty-third Teaching Building
 Life Science Building

Southwest China Normal University
Southwest China Normal University was one of the key comprehensive universities under the administration of the Chinese Ministry of Education. Originally it was created as the Southwest Teachers College. The college was the result of several mergers of the former National Women's Teachers College and the Sichuan Provincial Educational College in 1950. It was then established as Southwest China Normal University in 1985.

Southwest Agricultural University
Southwest Agricultural University was created in 1950, as the Southwest Agricultural College. The college was the end result of several institutions which were Sichuan Provincial Educational College, the Western China University and Xianghui College.

In 1979, it was authorized by the State Council to be one of the national key universities. It was restructured as Southwest Agricultural College. In 1958, the college was upgraded as Southwest Agricultural University.

In 2001, Sichuan Animal Husbandry and Veterinary College and the Citrus Research Institute of Chinese Academy of Agriculture were absorbed into Southwest Agricultural University. This marked the beginning of a new Southwest Agricultural University which specializes from teaching, pedagogy, psychology, agronomy and agriculture.

Prior to the merger, Southwest China Normal University and Southwest Agricultural University were neighbors with only a wall separating the two universities. Both universities had a long historical relationship, which could be located back to their common origin, West China Union University, founded in 1906.

Academics

Scientific Misconduct
Qian Zhang, a researcher at Southwest University, was accused of having recycled tables, impossible statistics, and unrealistic properties in the raw data of the scientific papers. 
Some papers were corrected by adding constant values to make statistics possible, however, none of the other summary or inferential statistics had to be changed in these corrigenda, as one might expect if there was an error in analysis.
For other papers, Dr. Zhang refused to provide raw data after being accused, allegedly to hide the academic misconduct. 
Dr. Zhang was reported to the university. The official response explained that Dr. Zhang was just very bad at statistics and would be receiving remedial training and writing some corrigenda. However, the letter did not comment on the strongest pieces of evidence for misconduct: the recycled tables, the impossible statistics, and the unrealistic properties of the raw data.

Faculty and Student
Southwest University employs 2,650 full-time teachers, and 300 professional researchers, 349 professors (research fellows), and 739 associate professors (associate research fellows, 113 PhD supervisors, and 513 Master's degree tutors.

Southwest University has over 50,000 students.

Library
There are three libraries in school: the central library, the north section library and the south section library. The central library which was built on 2005 is the newest and largest one. The university library holds 3,800,000 volumes of items in total by January 2014.

References

External links

Southwest University official website
Study at Southwest University
 School of Computer and Information Science

 
Universities and colleges in Chongqing
Project 211
Educational institutions established in 1906
Educational institutions established in 2005
2005 establishments in China
1906 establishments in China